Mesa Verde (Spanish for "Green Table") is a census-designated place in Riverside County, California. The 2010 United States census reported Mesa Verde's population was 1,023.

Geography
According to the United States Census Bureau, the CDP covers an area of 4.3 square miles (11.2 km), all of it land.

Demographics
At the 2010 census Mesa Verde had a population of 1,023. The racial makeup of Mesa Verde was 589 (57.6%) White, 8 (0.8%) African American, 9 (0.9%) Native American, 4 (0.4%) Asian, 1 (0.1%) Pacific Islander, 373 (36.5%) from other races, and 39 (3.8%) from two or more races. Hispanic or Latino of any race were 715 people (69.9%).

The whole population lived in households, no one lived in non-institutionalized group quarters and no one was institutionalized.

There were 312 households, 146 (46.8%) had children under the age of 18 living in them, 169 (54.2%) were opposite-sex married couples living together, 48 (15.4%) had a female householder with no husband present, 26 (8.3%) had a male householder with no wife present.  There were 18 (5.8%) unmarried opposite-sex partnerships, and 2 (0.6%) same-sex married couples or partnerships. 60 households (19.2%) were one person and 22 (7.1%) had someone living alone who was 65 or older. The average household size was 3.28.  There were 243 families (77.9% of households); the average family size was 3.75.

The age distribution was 335 people (32.7%) under the age of 18, 98 people (9.6%) aged 18 to 24, 269 people (26.3%) aged 25 to 44, 219 people (21.4%) aged 45 to 64, and 102 people (10.0%) who were 65 or older.  The median age was 29.8 years. For every 100 females, there were 110.9 males.  For every 100 females age 18 and over, there were 107.2 males.

There were 360 housing units at an average density of 82.9 per square mile, of the occupied units 201 (64.4%) were owner-occupied and 111 (35.6%) were rented. The homeowner vacancy rate was 2.4%; the rental vacancy rate was 22.9%.  631 people (61.7% of the population) lived in owner-occupied housing units and 392 people (38.3%) lived in rental housing units.

References

Census-designated places in Riverside County, California
Census-designated places in California